The Mandinka language or Mandingo, is a Mande language spoken by the Mandinka people of Guinea, northern Guinea-Bissau, the Casamance region of Senegal, and in The Gambia where it is one of the principal languages.

Mandinka belongs to the Manding branch of Mande and is thus similar to Bambara and Maninka/Malinké but with only 5 instead of 7 vowels.  
In a majority of areas, it is a tonal language with two tones: low and high, although the particular variety spoken in the Gambia and Senegal borders on a pitch accent due to its proximity with non-tonal neighboring languages like Wolof.

Phonology

Mandinka is here represented by the variety spoken in Casamance. There is little dialectical diversity.

Tone
Mandinka has two tones, high and low. Unmodified nouns are either high tone on all syllables or low tone on all syllables. The definite suffix -o takes a low tone on high-tone nouns and a falling tone on low-tone nouns. It also assimilates any preceding short vowel, resulting in a long /oo/ with either low or falling tone. It shortens a preceding long high vowel (ii > io, uu > uo; ee optionally > either eo or ee) or assimilates itself (aa remains aa) leaving only its tone:
/búŋ/ 'a room' > /búŋò/ 'the room'
/tèŋ/ 'a palm tree' > /tèŋô/ 'the palm tree'
/kídí/ 'a gun' > /kídòò/ 'the gun'
/kòrdàà/ 'a house' > /kòrdáà/ 'the house'

In Senegal and Gambia, Mandinka is approaching a system of pitch accent under the influence of local non-tonal languages such as Wolof, Serer, and Jola.

The tonal system remains more robust in the Eastern and Southern Mandinka dialects (Tilibo) spoken in the Guinea-Bissau, Guinea and Eastern Senegal. These conservative dialects merge into other conservative Manding languages like Maninka, the once official language of the Mali Empire, Bambara, and Susu. All of these preserve the typical West African terraced downstep in tonality that is only lightly alluded to in the Western Mandinka dialects spoken in much of Gambia and Senegal.

Vowels
All may be long or short. There are no nasal vowels; instead, there is a coda consonant /ŋ/. Long vowels are written double: aa, ee, ii, oo, uu.

Consonants
The following table gives the consonants in the Latin orthography, and their IPA equivalent when they differ.

Syllabic nasals occur in e.g. nnààm 'yes!' (response), ŋte "I, me". Word-initial mb, nd, ndy, ng occur but are not particularly common; it is not clear whether they should be considered syllabic nasals or additional consonants.

Consonants may be geminated in the middles of words (at least /pp, cc, jj, kk, ll, mm, nn, ññ/). It assimilates to the following consonant: /ns, nc, mb/ etc. Syllable-final /r/ and /s/ are found in French loans (e.g. /kùrtù/ "pants").

Orthography
The Latin alphabet and the Arabic alphabet are widely used for Mandinka; the former is official, but the latter is more widely used and older. In addition, the pan-Manding writing system, the N'Ko script, invented in 1949, is often used in north east Guinea and in bordering communities in Ivory Coast and Mali. Additionally, the Garay alphabet, originally developed for Wolof, has seen some limited use.

In the Latin script, c represents , ŋ , and ñ ; the letters v, x, z, and q are not used. Vowels are as in Spanish or Italian and are doubled to indicate length or distinguish words that are otherwise homophones.

The Arabic script uses no extra letters (apart from, rarely, an extra vowel mark for e), but some of the letters are pronounced differently from in Arabic.

The Latin and Arabic consonants correspond as follows:

Letters in italics are not normally used in native Mandinka words. ه (h) may also be used in the Arabic scfy to indicate a final glottal stop, which is not noted in the Latin script. The letter ŋ of the Latin script is often indicated with vowel signs in the Arabic script; see below.

The vowels correspond as follows (diacritics are placed over or under the consonant in Arabic):

In addition, a small Arabic 2 (۲) may be used to indicate reduplication, and the hamza may be used as in Arabic to indicate glottal stops more precisely.

Titles
 Faama: "father," "leader," or "king"
 Mansa (title): "sultan", "king" or "emperor"

See also
Mande languages
Manding languages
Mandinka people
Mandé

References

Bibliography
R. T. Addis, A Study on the Writing of Mandinka in Arabic script, 1963.
Dramé, Man Lafi, Parlons Mandinka, L'Harmattan 2003 (in French)

External links

 ELAR archive of Bainouk and its main contact language Mandinka
Wolof and Mandinka resources, including grammar and dictionary

Mandinka
Manding languages
Languages of the Gambia
Languages of Guinea-Bissau
Languages of Senegal